Piping systems in U.S. nuclear power plants that are relied on for the safe shutdown of the plant (i.e. “safety-related”) are typically constructed to Section III of the American Society of Mechanical Engineers (ASME) Boiler and Pressure Vessel (B&PV) Code.  The materials allowed by the ASME B&PV Code have been historically limited to metallic materials only. Due to the success of high density polyethylene (HDPE) in other industries, nuclear power plants in the U.S. have expressed interest in using HDPE piping in ASME B&PV Code applications.  In 2008, the first U.S. nuclear power plant was approved by the United States Nuclear Regulatory Commission (U.S. NRC) to install HDPE in an ASME B&PV Code safety-related system. Since then, the rules for using HDPE have been integrated into the 2015 Edition and 2017 Edition of the ASME B&PV Code.  The NRC approved of the 2015 and 2017 Editions in 2020.

History 

 1963 – Section III of the ASME B&PV Code created and only allows metallic materials.
 2007 – Code Case N-755 issued on behalf of Duke Energy for the use of Polyethylene Plastic Pipe for Class 3 piping applications.  Code Case N-755 limits HDPE fusing to butt fusion.
 2008 – U.S. NRC grants Callaway Plant, Unit 1, permission to use HDPE in the Essential Service Water System based on Code Case N-755 and additional plant specific information.
 2009 – U.S. NRC grants Catawba Nuclear Station, Units 1 and 2, permission to use HDPE in the Nuclear Service Water System based on Code Case N-755 and additional plant specific information.
 2010 – First Revision to Code Case N-755 issued.
 2013 – Second Revision to Code Case N-755 issued.
 2014 – U.S. NRC rejects Code Case N-755-0 (Revision 0) for generic use due to unresolved issues concerning the joining procedure, degradation processes, and examination of joints.
 2015 – U.S. NRC grants Edwin I. Hatch Nuclear Plant, Unit 2, permission to use HDPE in the Plant Service Water System.
 2015 –The use of Polyethylene Plastic Pipe for Class 3 applications is incorporated into Mandatory Appendix XXVI of ASME Section III.
 2017 – U.S. NRC rejects Code Case N-755-1 for generic use due to ongoing unresolved issues.
2020 - U.S. NRC approves 2015 Edition of ASME B&PV Code which includes the use of HDPE piping for Class 3 applications.

ASME boiler & pressure vessel code sections for HDPE 
ASME B&PV Code Section III – Rules for Construction of Nuclear Facility Components

 Appendix XXVI – Rules for Construction of Class 3 Buried Polyethylene Pressure Piping 
 Article XXVI-1000: General Requirements
 Article XXVI-2000: Materials 
 Article XXVI-3000: Design
 Article XXVI-4000: Fabrication and Installation
 Article XXVI-5000: Examination 
 Article XXVI-6000: Testing
 Article XXVI-7000: Overpressure Protection
 Article XXVI-8000: Nameplates, Stamping, and Reports
 Article XXVI-9000: Glossary
 Mandatory Supplements I – III
 Non-mandatory Supplements A - D

ASME B&PV Code Section IX – Welding, Brazing, and Fusing Qualifications

 Part QF – Plastic Fusing
 Article XXI – Plastic Fusing General Requirements
 Article XXII – Fusing Procedure Qualifications

Application 
The use of HDPE in U.S. nuclear power plants is currently limited to PE4710 material since this was the material first identified in Code Case N-755 and approved by the U.S. NRC.  Code Case N-755 and the 2015 Edition of ASME B&PV Code, Section III, Appendix XXVI are limited to butt fusion (i.e. hot plate welding) only.  Electrofusion is included in the 2017 Edition of the ASME B&PV Code, Section III, Appendix XXVI.  Both N-755 and Appendix XXVI limit the use of HDPE to Class 3 piping systems.

Required examination and testing 
All welds made with either hot plate welding or electrofusion welding are required to be visually inspected and have a hydrostatic pressure test.  All joints in pipe 4 inches and large must have 100% volumetric non-destructive examination (NDE) performed.  The volumetric NDE may be either ultrasonic examination or microwave examination.

Benefits 
The steel piping used in service water systems at nuclear power plants are often subjected to various forms of degradation including general corrosion, microbiological induced corrosion, tuberculation, and galvanic corrosion.  HDPE is typically impervious to these forms of degradation.  Additionally, nuclear power plants typically have robust seismic requirements and HDPE is very flexible which increases its ability to survive an earthquake.

Challenges 
The use of HDPE in nuclear power plants requires extensive qualification and testing efforts to demonstrate that the material is safe under all design basis conditions.  The U.S. NRC has raised concerns in the past with the use of HDPE related to butt fusion joint integrity, the ability to detect flaws in joints, and the potential for slow crack growth.  This has prevented the NRC from generically approving the use of HDPE.  Nuclear Power plants can still request approval from the U.S. NRC on a case-by-case basis (i.e., relief request).

Current status of U.S. NRC approval  
The NRC has reviewed the 2015 and 2017 Editions of the ASME B&PV Code which have been accepted and incorporation into 10CFR50.55a with the following conditions related to the use of HDPE:

References

Plastics applications
Nuclear power stations